
Charles "Kid" Keinath (November 13, 1885 – April 1966) was an American college athlete who was a four-time All-American in basketball while at the University of Pennsylvania. He also won national championships in both basketball (1907–08) and football (1908) at Penn. In 1907–08, the basketball team finished 24–4 and was retroactively named the national champions by the Helms Athletic Foundation. Then, in 1908, the football team finished 11–0–1 and was named co-national champions with Harvard and LSU with Keinath leading the team as quarterback.  He was team captain as a senior for the basketball team and led the Quakers to a 22-game winning streak that spanned between the 1907–08 and 1908–09 seasons.

Keinath was a native of Philadelphia, Pennsylvania, and attended Central High School, where he graduated in 1905. Aside from playing basketball and football at Penn, he also played on the school's baseball team, although his most personal success occurred while playing basketball. In addition to being selected an All-American all four years and winning a national championship, Keinath also led the Eastern Intercollegiate Basketball League in scoring during both his junior and senior seasons.

After graduating from the University of Pennsylvania in 1909, Keinath became the coach of the freshmen baseball and varsity men's basketball teams. He spent three seasons guiding the basketball team and compiled an overall record of 36–25, including a 12–14 record in conference play. Keinath also served as an assistant coach for the football team for 30 years.

Head coaching record

References

1885 births
1966 deaths
All-American college men's basketball players
American football quarterbacks
American men's basketball coaches
American men's basketball players
Baseball players from Pennsylvania
Basketball coaches from Pennsylvania
Basketball players from Pennsylvania
Central High School (Philadelphia) alumni
College men's basketball head coaches in the United States
Date of death missing
Forwards (basketball)
Penn Quakers baseball coaches
Penn Quakers baseball players
Penn Quakers football coaches
Penn Quakers football players
Penn Quakers men's basketball coaches
Penn Quakers men's basketball players
Place of birth missing
Place of death missing
Players of American football from Pennsylvania